Manidipine is a calcium channel blocker (dihydropyridine type) that is used clinically as an antihypertensive.

It was patented in 1982 and approved for medical use in 1990.

References 

Calcium channel blockers
Cyclizines
CYP2D6 inhibitors
Dihydropyridines
Nitrobenzenes
Carboxylate esters